This is a list of known Hindi songs performed by Kavita Krishnamurthy from 1976 to date. She had also sung in several other different languages which are not included here.

1970s

1976

1980s

1980

1981

1982

1983

1984

1985

1986

1987

1988

1989

1990s

1990

1991

1992

1993

1994

1995

1996

1997

1998

1999

2000s

2000

2001

2002

2003

2004

2005

2006

2007

2008

2009

2010s

2010

2011

2012

2013

2014

2015

2016

2017

2021

Non-film Hindi songs

Hindi television songs

Bengali songs

Film songs

Non-film songs

Marathi songs

This is a list of known Marathi songs performed by Kavita Krishnamurthy. She had also sung in several other different languages which are not included here.

Maithili songs

Nepali songs

Oriya songs

Bhojpuri songs

Non-film songs

See also
 Kavita Krishnamurthy
 List of Songs recorded by Kavita Krishnamurthy in South-Indian languages

References

External links
 

Hindi songs
Krishnamurthy